Heritage365 (formerly known as New Heritage) was a professional magazine for the cultural heritage sector, especially museums. The magazine was founded in 2003. It was published by Heritage Development Ltd., based in Milton Keynes, England.

References

Bi-monthly magazines published in the United Kingdom
Business magazines published in the United Kingdom
Cultural magazines published in the United Kingdom
Defunct magazines published in the United Kingdom
Magazines established in 2003
Magazines with year of disestablishment missing
Professional and trade magazines